Samoan Clipper was one of ten Pan American Airways Sikorsky S-42 flying boats. It exploded near Pago Pago, American Samoa, on January 11, 1938, while piloted by aviator Ed Musick. Musick and his crew of six died in the crash. The aircraft was carrying only airmail and express freight; no passengers were aboard.

The aircraft developed an oil leak shortly after taking off from Pago Pago harbor, and the crew decided to return to port. However, the S-42, fully loaded with fuel, was too heavy to land safely in the limited space of the harbor, so the crew elected to dump fuel before landing. While fuel dumping was in progress, there was a fire and explosion which destroyed the aircraft, killing all aboard. The exact cause of ignition for the fire could not be determined.

References

External links
 1938 flights to and from New Zealand 
 Airmail items carried on outward trip
 Samoan Clipper at http://planecrashinfo.com

Individual aircraft
Airliner accidents and incidents involving in-flight explosions
Aviation accidents and incidents in American Samoa
Airliner accidents and incidents in American Samoa
Pan Am accidents and incidents
1938 in American Samoa
Aviation accidents and incidents in the United States in 1938